The Understanding is the second studio album by rapper Memphis Bleek, released by Get Low Records, Roc-A-Fella Records, and Def Jam Recordings on December 5, 2000. As of October 2002, the album has been certified gold by the RIAA for shipment of over 500,000 units.

Track listing

Samples

“Madhouse” by Silver Convention
From the album World Is A Madhouse (1976)
Sampled in “Intro - U Know Bleek”
Produced by Just Blaze

“4 Da Fam” by Amil feat. Jay-Z, Beanie Sigel, Memphis Bleek
From the album All Money Is Legal (2000)
Sampled in “Intro-U Know Bleek”
Produced by Just Blaze

“Reina De La Noche” by Ricardo Montaner
From the album Un toque de misterio (1990)
Sampled in “I Get High”
Produced by T.T.

“Su Lin (The Monk)” by Lalo Schifrin
From the album Enter The Dragon (1973)
Sampled in “My Mind Right (remix)”
Produced by DJ Twinz

“Lady Luck” by Kenny Loggins 
From the album Celebrate Me Home (1977)
Sampled in “All Types Of Shit”
Produced by Eddie Scoresazy

“If That’s The Way You Feel (Then Let’s Fall In Love)” by White Heat *
From the album ?
Sampled in “Everyday”
Produced by EZ Elpee

“I Want to Know What Love Is” by Foreigner
From the album Agent Provocateur (1984)
Sampled in “In My Life”
Produced by Just Blaze

Charts

Weekly charts

Year-end charts

References

2000 albums
Memphis Bleek albums
Albums produced by Just Blaze
Albums produced by Timbaland
Roc-A-Fella Records albums
Def Jam Recordings albums